Music of a Life is a 2001 novella by the French writer Andreï Makine. A tale of Soviet oppression, it tells the story of a talented Russian piano player who has to abandon his career right before his first concert, flees to the countryside and adopts the identity of a dead soldier.

Reception
Publishers Weekly wrote: "It's a simple story, but Makine's lovely lyric writing—excellently translated—in which the scenes are imagined with a sharply cinematic focus, gives it considerable depth and emotion; the quiet ending, back in the present time, is wrenching."

The book was awarded the Grand prix RTL-Lire.

References

2001 French novels
Éditions du Seuil books
French novellas
French-language novels
Novels about political repression in the Soviet Union
Novels by Andreï Makine
Novels set in the Stalin era